The Ansarlu or Ansaroğlu are  Turks adherent of Twelver Shī‘ism. This tribe belongs to a branch of Kangarlu, belonging to the Qizilbash people of Afghanistan. In Afghanistan the clan is known to have who originally migrated into the country with Nader Shah Afshar. Takht e Nadir Shah Afshar, located in Wazirabad, was Nader Shah's base during his Indian campaign. This tribe is also found in the Qala e Fatullah  villages of Wazirabad in Kabul.

See also

 Qizilbash
 Oghuz Turks
 Afshār
 Azerbaijani people

External links
http://southturkistan.wordpress.com/2009/10/09/qizilbash-people-of-afghanistan/
https://web.archive.org/web/20090514164312/http://ffta1.com/index//index.php?option=com_content&task=view&id=848&Itemid=117
https://web.archive.org/web/20091207151831/http://www.turkdirlik.com/TurkDunyasi/Iran/SNaimi0005.htm
https://archive.today/20130112133909/http://www.asilkan.org/sabit/afgan.htm

Ethnic groups in Afghanistan